James E. Bracken (March 12, 1918 – April 19, 2008) was an American Thoroughbred horse racing trainer based in Florida.

Background
Bracken began his career in horse racing in 1935 at Jefferson Downs Racetrack in New Orleans. He began as a galloper before becoming a jockey, and while that did not last long he was able to become a jockey agent.  Among his clients were several future Hall of Fame inductees including John Adams, Bill Hartack, Bill Shoemaker, Jacinto Vásquez and Walter Blum.

In 1976, at age 48, Bracken embarked on a career that would see him earn Calder Race Course Hall of Fame honors.

References

1918 births
2008 deaths
American horse trainers
People from Charleston, Missouri